OGC Nice won Division 1 season 1955/1956 of the French Association Football League with 43 points.

Participating teams

 Bordeaux
 RC Lens
 Lille OSC
 Olympique Lyonnais
 Olympique de Marseille
 FC Metz
 AS Monaco
 FC Nancy
 OGC Nice
 Nîmes Olympique
 RC Paris
 Stade de Reims
 AS Saint-Etienne
 UA Sedan-Torcy
 FC Sochaux-Montbéliard
 RC Strasbourg
 Toulouse FC
 AS Troyes-Savinienne

Final table

Promoted from Division 2, who will play in Division 1 season 1956/1957
 Stade Rennais UC:Champion of Division 2
 Angers SCO:runner-up
 US Valenciennes-Anzin: Third place

Results

Top goalscorers

OGC Nice Winning Squad 1955-'56

Goal
 Dominique Colonna
 Henri Hairabedian

Defence
 Gilbert Bonvin
 Rémy Fronzoni
 César Hector Gonzales
 Alphonse Martinez
 Aleardo Nani
 Guy Poitevin

Midfield
 José Carlos Brandaozinho
 Jean Luciano
 François Milazzo

Attack
 Jean-Pierre Alba
 Mohammed Abderrazak
 Ruben Bravo
 Robert Brun
 Just Fontaine
 Victor Nuremberg
 Joseph Ujlaki

Management
 Luis Carniglia (Coach)

References

 Division 1 season 1955-1956 at pari-et-gagne.com

Ligue 1 seasons
French
1